The UK Singles Chart is a music chart compiled by the Official Charts Company (OCC) that calculates the best-selling singles of the week in the United Kingdom. Since 2005, the chart has been based on the sales of both physical and digital singles, initially on the condition that the single was available in both formats. In 2007, the rules were changed so that legal downloads of all songs, irrespective of whether a physical copy was available, were eligible to chart and since July 2014, streaming has been included.

Best-selling singles based on paid-for sales

This is a list of the sales of records released from 1 January 2001 onwards; sales for this period of records released before 2001 are not included. With sales of over 1,920,000, "Happy" by Pharrell Williams is the best-selling single in the UK since January 2001. Will Young's double A-side single "Anything Is Possible" / "Evergreen", which has sold over 1,790,000 million copies, is the second-biggest seller, followed by "Blurred Lines" by Robin Thicke featuring T.I. and Williams in third. The top five is completed by "Uptown Funk" at four and "Someone Like You" by Adele in fifth. As of September 2017, 62 singles released in the 2000s have sold over 1 million copies.

Until June 2014, only a paid download or a purchase of a physical single counted as a sale. Based on this definition, these are the best-selling singles in the UK since 2001. Sales positions are current .

Best-selling songs based on combined sales
From 2014 streaming has counted towards sales (sometimes called "combined sales" or "chart sales") at the rate of 100 streams equal to one download or physical purchase, although the singles chart no longer uses this ratio. In September 2017, the OCC changed their definition of a 'million seller' to include streaming. These are the biggest selling songs based on combined physical, download and streaming sales. As of September 2017 there were nine over 2 million and 185 over a million combined sales from the 2000s Century. In October 2017, "Shape of You" by Ed Sheeran became the first song from the 2000s Century to achieve 3 million combined sales.

See also
 List of best-selling singles of the 2000s (decade) in the United Kingdom
 List of best-selling singles of the 2010s in the United Kingdom

References

21st century
United Kingdom Singles
United Kingdom Singles
21st century in the United Kingdom